Neighborhood Supastar, Pt. 3 is a collaboration album by American rappers The Boy Boy Young Mess and Philthy Rich, released in June 2011 via Livewire Records & SMC Recordings. The last of the Neighborhood Supastar series, it features guest appearances from Mistah F.A.B., J. Stalin, Glasses Malone, Rydah J. Klyde and Kafani, among others. It charted on the Heatseekers Pacific chart.

Track listing

References

2011 albums
Collaborative albums
Messy Marv albums
SMC Recordings albums
Sequel albums